(1160 – 1185) was a military leader of the late Heian period of Japan. He was the son of Taira no Norimori. He fought in the Genpei War against the Minamoto clan.

Genpei War

Noritsune was a commander during the Genpei War. He fought in many battles including the battles of Mizushima and Dan-no-ura. He also fought in the Battle of Ichi-no-Tani, and killed Satō Tsugunobu in the Battle of Yashima.

Death
He committed suicide in the Battle of Dan-no-ura, while holding a Minamoto warrior under each arm plunging into the sea. His father also committed suicide at the same battle. In the play, he is disguised as the priest 'Yokawa no Kakuhan', until he is forced to confess his true identity by Benkei.

See also
The Tale of Heike

References

1160 births
1185 deaths
Taira clan
Suicides by drowning in Japan
Kabuki characters